General elections were held in Mauritius on 7 November 2019. The result was a victory for the Mauritian Alliance (a coalition of the Militant Socialist Movement (MSM), Muvman Liberater, Alan Ganoo Movement and Plateforme Militante), which won 42 of the 70 seats. Pravind Jugnauth of the MSM remained Prime Minister.

Electoral system
The National Assembly has 62 elected members elected in 20 three-seat constituencies and one two-seat constituency (the island of Rodrigues). The elections are held using the block vote system, whereby voters have as many votes as there are seats available.

In addition to the elected members, the Electoral Supervisory Commission has the power to appoint a further eight members. The additional members are chosen from amongst the unsuccessful candidates who received the highest number of votes, and are appointed with the aim of balancing the parliamentary representation of different ethnic groups.

Results
The ruling Militant Socialist Movement (MSM) won over half of the seats in Parliament, meaning incumbent Prime Minister Pravind Jugnauth, who took over from his father Anerood Jugnauth in 2017, will serve a full five-year term as Prime Minister.

Of the 62 directly-elected seats, the MSM won 38, the Labour Party won 14, the Mauritian Militant Movement (MMM) won 8, and the Rodrigues People's Organisation (OPR) won 2 seats from the island of Rodrigues.

Aftermath
Following the announcement of the results and the formation of a new government, several legal petitions were lodged in Supreme Court challenging the validity of the results, claiming electoral irregularities, a lack of transparency, undue influence by political activists and allegations of fraud and electoral bribery. The presence of independent monitors was claimed to have been ineffective. The government was also criticised for its intensive use of state media. Murdered activist Kistnen was rumoured to be about to disclose details of how 1,200 Bangladeshi nationals had been taken to vote multiple times in different constituencies and that the MNMM had exceeded spending limits. However, according to international observers from the SADC and from the French diplomacy, the election was free and fair.

References

Mauritius
General election
Elections in Mauritius
November 2019 events in Africa